John E. McConnell (December 6, 1863 – July 13, 1928) was a member of the Wisconsin State Assembly.

Biography
McConnell was born on December 6, 1863 in Farmington, La Crosse County, Wisconsin. He graduated from the University of Wisconsin–Madison in 1887. McConnell was elected to the Assembly in 1908. Previously, he was District Attorney of La Crosse County, Wisconsin and Chairman of the Republican Committee of La Crosse County. He died in La Crosse, Wisconsin on July 13, 1928.

References

People from Farmington, La Crosse County, Wisconsin
Republican Party members of the Wisconsin State Assembly
District attorneys in Wisconsin
University of Wisconsin–Madison alumni
University of Wisconsin Law School alumni
1863 births
1928 deaths